The 2019 Cricket World Cup group stage was played in a round-robin league format, with all 10 teams playing each other once in a single group, resulting in a total of 45 matches being played. The top four teams from the group progressed to the knockout stage. A similar format was previously used in the 1992 Cricket World Cup.

On 25 June 2019, Australia became the first team to qualify for the semi-finals, after beating England at Lord's. India became the second team to qualify for the semi-finals, after they defeated Bangladesh at Edgbaston on 2 July 2019. The following day saw tournament hosts England become the third team to qualify for the semi-finals, after they beat New Zealand at the Riverside Ground. New Zealand were the fourth and final team to qualify for the semi-finals, after Pakistan were unable to increase their net run rate sufficiently enough in their match against Bangladesh at Lord's.

Points table

Group stage summary

Matches

England vs South Africa

Pakistan vs West Indies

New Zealand vs Sri Lanka

Australia vs Afghanistan

Bangladesh vs South Africa

England vs Pakistan

Afghanistan vs Sri Lanka

India vs South Africa

Bangladesh vs New Zealand

Australia vs West Indies

Pakistan vs Sri Lanka

England vs Bangladesh

Afghanistan vs New Zealand

Australia vs India

South Africa vs West Indies

Bangladesh vs Sri Lanka

Australia vs Pakistan

India vs New Zealand

England vs West Indies

Australia vs Sri Lanka

Afghanistan vs South Africa

India vs Pakistan

Bangladesh vs West Indies

England vs Afghanistan

New Zealand vs South Africa

Australia vs Bangladesh

England vs Sri Lanka

Afghanistan vs India

New Zealand vs West Indies

Pakistan vs South Africa

Afghanistan vs Bangladesh

England vs Australia

New Zealand vs Pakistan

India vs West Indies

South Africa vs Sri Lanka

Afghanistan vs Pakistan

Australia vs New Zealand

England vs India

Sri Lanka vs West Indies

Bangladesh vs India

England vs New Zealand

West Indies vs Afghanistan

Pakistan vs Bangladesh

India vs Sri Lanka

South Africa vs Australia

References

External links
 ICC Cricket World Cup 2019 Playing Conditions, International Cricket Council

2019 Cricket World Cup